The 1984 United States presidential election in Ohio took place on November 6, 1984. All 50 states and the District of Columbia, were part of the 1984 United States presidential election. State voters chose 23 electors to the Electoral College, which selected the president and vice president of the United States.

Ohio was won by incumbent United States President Ronald Reagan of California, who was running against former Vice President Walter Mondale of Minnesota. Reagan ran for a second time with incumbent Vice President and former C.I.A. Director George H. W. Bush of Texas, and Mondale ran with Representative Geraldine Ferraro of New York, the first major female candidate for the vice presidency.

Ohio's delegation in the United States House of Representatives switched from Republican to Democratic control despite Reagan's victory in the state.

The presidential election of 1984 was a very partisan election for Ohio, with over 99% of the electorate voting only either Democratic or Republican, though several more parties did appear on the ballot. All but six counties gave a majority to Reagan, and the remaining six--Cuyahoga along with five counties on Ohio's eastern border with Pennsylvania and West Virginia—gave Mondale a majority.

Ohio weighed in for this election as 0.12% more Republican than the national average. , this is the last election in which Lucas County, Athens County, and Summit County voted for a Republican presidential candidate, the last until 2016 that Ashtabula County voted for a Republican candidate and the last until 2020 that Lorain County voted for a Republican candidate.

Reagan won the election in Ohio with a decisive 18-point landslide, making Ohio slightly more Republican than the nation overall. Reagan won all but six of Ohio's counties, but, amongst the state's population centers, scored particularly strong wins in Hamilton and Franklin Counties, home to Cincinnati and Columbus and their closer-in suburbs, respectively; he won over 60% in both and won each by a raw vote margin of over 100,000 votes. Mondale's wins were limited to Cuyahoga, which he won with less than 60% of the vote, and a series of counties in Appalachian Ohio, along the border with Pennsylvania and West Virginia: Mahoning, Trumbull, Jefferson, Belmont, and Monroe. Unlike Eisenhower in 1952 and 1956 and Nixon in 1972, Reagan was unable to capture the state's largest county, Cuyahoga; however, Mondale was unable to retain Athens County (home to Ohio University), despite that it had voted Democratic in the last three straight elections (including for McGovern). While Pennsylvania and much of the Upper Midwest shifted more Democratic in this election, Ohio voted in line with the nation, presaging its role as the only large Midwestern state (and indeed as the only large state outside the South) to vote Republican in 2000, 2004, and 2020.   

As of the 2020 United States presidential election, this is the last time Ohio voted to the left of neighboring Michigan.

Democratic platform

Walter Mondale accepted the Democratic nomination for presidency after pulling narrowly ahead of Senator Gary Hart of Colorado and Rev. Jesse Jackson of Illinois - his main contenders during what would be a very contentious Democratic primary. During the campaign, Mondale was vocal about reduction of government spending, and, in particular, was vocal against heightened military spending on the nuclear arms race against the Soviet Union, which was reaching its peak on both sides in the early 1980s.

Taking a (what was becoming the traditional liberal) stance on the social issues of the day, Mondale advocated for gun control, the right to choose regarding abortion, and strongly opposed the repeal of laws regarding institutionalized prayer in public schools. He also criticized Reagan for his economic marginalization of the poor, stating that Reagan's reelection campaign was "a happy talk campaign," not focused on the real issues at hand.

A very significant political move during this election: the Democratic Party nominated Representative Geraldine Ferraro to run with Mondale as Vice-President. Ferraro is the first female candidate to receive such a nomination in United States history. She said in an interview at the 1984 Democratic National Convention that this action "opened a door which will never be closed again," speaking to the role of women in politics.

Republican platform

By 1984, Reagan was very popular with voters across the nation as the President who saw them out of the economic stagflation of the early and middle 1970s, and into a period of (relative) economic stability.

The economic success seen under Reagan was politically accomplished (principally) in two ways. The first was initiation of deep tax cuts for the wealthy, and the second was a wide-spectrum of tax cuts for crude oil production and refinement, namely, with the 1980 Windfall profits tax cuts. These policies were augmented with a call for heightened military spending, the cutting of social welfare programs for the poor. Collectively called "Reaganomics", these economic policies were established through several pieces of legislation passed between 1980 and 1987.

Reaganomics has (along with legislation passed under presidents George H. W. Bush and Bill Clinton) been criticized by many analysts as "setting the stage" for economic troubles in the United States after 2007, such as the Great Recession.

Virtually unopposed during the Republican primaries, Reagan ran on a campaign of furthering his economic policies. Reagan vowed to continue his "war on drugs," passing sweeping legislation after the 1984 election in support of mandatory minimum sentences for drug possession.  Furthermore, taking a (what was becoming the traditional conservative) stance on the social issues of the day, Reagan strongly opposed legislation regarding comprehension of abortion, and (to a lesser extent) environmentalism, regarding the latter as simply being bad for business.

Results

Results by county

See also
 United States presidential elections in Ohio
 Presidency of Ronald Reagan

References

Ohio
1984
1984 Ohio elections